A Knot in the Grain and other Stories is a collection of short fantasy stories by author and Newbery Medalist, Robin McKinley. Published by HarperTrophy, this collection of stories came out in 1994 although several of the stories had been previously printed. 

Stories included:

 "The Healer"
 "The Stagman"
 "Touk's House"
 "Buttercup"
 "A Knot in the Grain"

Summary

The Healer: 
Lily was born mute and with a sorrowful look deep within her eyes. Born with the healer's gift, she is apprenticed early on to the local healer, Jolin. When Lily runs into a stranger, with hidden sorrow himself, she is overjoyed to discover his ability to communicate with her telepathically. Filled with excitement and longing for this opportunity to communicate, Lily invites the stranger home to meet Jolin, who senses his mage-mark and is instantly suspicious, for mages are not to be trusted. But the mage, Sahath, stays doing honest work, and gaining trust and favor among them. Can he help Lily find her voice and in return can she heal his sorrowful heart?

The Stagman:
Ruen is princess of Arn, and will soon become queen much to her Regent Uncle's displeasure. Her Uncle has a lust for continued power and as Ruen's name day approaches, he will stop at nothing to ensure his place as Regent. He invents portents and a purifying ritual in which he will leave his niece, alone, chained in an old cave of sacrifice. When night falls upon the helpless princess, she sees the shadows of a creature, a stagman, who will ultimately lead her to her destiny.

Touk's House:
In return for a Woodcutter's youngest baby girl, a witch offers herbs that will save another of the Woodcutter's daughters. The baby, Erana, is lovingly raised by the witch alongside the witch's troll son, Touk. Erana learns of herbs, love, and friendship until her seventeenth birthday when she hears the truth about her birth parents and determines to venture off and discover who she is and ultimately decide her own future.

Buttercups:
A beautiful young woman named Coral marries an old farmer. He considers himself extremely fortunate until Coral's focus on the hill behind his farm causes him to question her motives. Risking upsetting the wild magic of his lands, he tries to keep his new wife happy, but what will be the consequences of his actions?

A Knot in the Grain:

Annabelle moves with her parents to a small town upstate. While missing her friends and feeling out of place in her new environment, she discovers a secret box hidden in her attic bedroom behind a knot of wood. The small, round, knobby things inside the box seem to be alive and perhaps somehow understand her. As a new highway threatens Annabelle's new environment, can she do anything about it. Should she even care?

References

 A Knot in the Grain and Other Stories Robin McKinley 

1994 short story collections
Fantasy short story collections
American short story collections